Ahn Jae-Gon (Hangul: 안재곤; born 15 August 1984) is a South Korean footballer who currently plays for Incheon Korail in the Korea National League.

At Incheon United, he made only 4 appearances in Hauzen Cup 2008.

In 2009, he joined National Police Agency FC for military duty.

References 

 

1984 births
Living people
South Korean footballers
Incheon United FC players
Daejeon Korail FC players
K League 1 players
Korea National League players
Association football midfielders